The Washington Metros were a professional basketball team based in Washington, D.C. that was a member of the Eastern Basketball Association. Following the 1977–78 season, the team became the Baltimore Metros.

Year-by-year

External links

Defunct basketball teams in the United States
Sports in Washington, D.C.
1977 establishments in Washington, D.C.
Basketball teams established in 1977
1978 disestablishments in Washington, D.C.
Sports clubs disestablished in 1978